Grandmesnil or Grandménil may refer to :

People
 Grandmesnil family, aristocratic family in Normandy in the 11th to 13th centuries, including 
 Hugh de Grandmesnil, lord of Grandmesnil, sheriff of Leicestershire
 Robert de Grandmesnil, Hugh's younger brother
 Ivo de Grandmesnil, Hugh's son
 Stage name of Jean-Baptiste Fauchard (1737-1816), French actor.

Places

 Grandmesnil : former commune of Calvados, merged into the new commune of L'Oudon
 Grandménil : former commune of Wallonia merged into Manhay

See also
 Mesnil (disambiguation)